Return of the Bumpasaurus is the fifth album by the rapper Sir Mix-a-Lot, released in 1996 by American Recordings. It peaked at No. 123 on the Billboard 200. It includes the single "Jump on It", which samples the Sugarhill Gang's version of "Apache".

Critical reception
The Los Angeles Times called the album "chock-full of the high beat-per-minute jams and molasses-thick grooves that made the self-proclaimed 'J.R. Ewing' of the Seattle rap scene a multimillionaire in the first place." The Baltimore Sun wrote that "most of the sounds here are decidedly second-hand, adding no fresh flavor to the bass-derived sound Mix-A-Lot has peddled from the start."

Track listing 
 "You Can Have Her" - 5:18
 "Da Bomb" - 0:50
 "Buckin' My Horse" - 4:29
 "Mob Style" - 4:30
 "Top Ten List" - 2:06
 "Man U Luv ta Hate" - 4:24
 "Bark Like You Want It" - 3:20
 "Bumpasaurus Cometh" - 1:23
 "Bumpasaurus" - 4:42
 "Denial" - 1:02
 "Aunt Thomasina" - 4:37
 "Jump on It" - 5:00
 "Aintsta" - 4:18
 "Sag" - 4:40
 "Message to a Drag Artist" - 2:31
 "Lead Yo Horse" - 4:14
 "Playthang" - 4:30 
 "Funk fo da Blvd." - 3:37 
 "Slide" - 3:43

References

Sir Mix-a-Lot albums
1996 albums
American Recordings (record label) albums
Albums produced by Rick Rubin